Galen Anile McKinley is a professor at Columbia University and the Lamont–Doherty Earth Observatory known for her work in the carbon cycle, particularly in the use of models to study the interface between the ocean and the atmosphere.

Education and career 
McKinley earned a B.S. from Rice University in 1995 and a Ph.D. from the Massachusetts Institute of Technology in 2002. Following postdoctoral positions at Instituto Nacional de Ecologia in Mexico and Princeton University, she joined the faculty at the University of Wisconsin Madison where she remained until 2017. She then moved to Columbia University and the Lamont–Doherty Earth Observatory and where she is a professor. In 2021 the National Science Foundation announced that a project for which McKinley serves as deputy director would receive $25 million to develop new models of ocean climate.

Research 
McKinley's early research examined the fluxes of oxygen between the atmosphere and the ocean. While a postdoctoral researcher in Mexico, she examined the impact of air pollution controls on Mexico City. In lakes, McKinley has examined changes in wind strength, circulation, and the optical properties of lakes. She has also investigated the potential for acidification of freshwater lakes from rising carbon dioxide levels. In marine systems she has examined the storage of carbon in the ocean, and changes over time in the oceans' ability to store carbon. Her recent work shows the importance of changes in the amount of carbon dioxide released due to human activities and the role of the 1991 eruption of Mount Pinatubo, and how changes in peoples' activities during the COVID-19 pandemic shifted the balance between greenhouse gas emissions and improvements in air quality.

Selected publications

Awards and honors 
McKinley was a Kavli Frontiers of Science fellow at the Chinese American Frontiers event in 2016. While at the University of Wisconsin Madison, McKinley was honored for her teaching with the Class of 1955 award, which she received in 2011. In 2020, McKinley received the Ocean Science Voyager Award from the American Geophysical Union, which honors a mid-career scientist for contributions to ocean sciences.

References

External links 

, November 22, 2021

Rice University alumni
Massachusetts Institute of Technology alumni
Columbia University faculty
Carbon scientists
American climatologists
Women climatologists
Year of birth missing (living people)
Living people